Hugh Sottovagina (died c. 1140), often referred to as Hugh the Chanter or Hugh the Chantor, was a historian for York Minster during the 12th century and was probably an archdeacon during the time of his writing. He was author of the Latin text known as the History of the Church of York.

References

 
 

1140 deaths
12th-century English Roman Catholic priests
12th-century English historians
12th-century Latin writers
Archdeacons of Cleveland
Year of birth unknown